Beaumont-le-Roger is a commune in  the department of Eure in Normandy region in northern France.

Geography
The commune is located in the valley of the Risle on the edge of the forest with which it shares its name.  It is crossed by the Paris-Cherbourg railway line, on which it has a station.  The Beaumont forest covers four communes; it is the largest private forest in Normandy.

History
Humphrey (or Honfroy, Onfroi or Umfrid) de Vieilles (died c. 1044) was the first holder of the "grand honneur" of Beaumont-le-Roger, one of the most important groups of domains in eastern Normandy and the founder of the House of Beaumont. He was married to Albreda or Alberée de la Haye Auberie. His son, Roger de Beaumont, a powerful 11th century lord and adviser to William the Conqueror, derived his family name from Beaumont, of which his family were lords.

Population

See also
Communes of the Eure department

References

External links

Official site

Communes of Eure